José Élber Pimentel da Silva (born 27 May 1992), simply known as Élber, is a Brazilian footballer who plays as a winger for Yokohama F. Marinos.

He made his professional debut for Cruzeiro in a 1-1 away draw to Fluminense in the Campeonato Brasileiro on September 7, 2011

Honours

Club
Cruzeiro
Campeonato Brasileiro Série A: 2013
Campeonato Mineiro: 2014

Bahia
 Campeonato Baiano: 2019

Yokohama F. Marinos
 J1 League: 2022
Japanese Super Cup: 2023

Individual
J.League Best XI: 2022

References

External links

1992 births
Living people
Brazilian footballers
Association football forwards
Campeonato Brasileiro Série A players
J1 League players
Cruzeiro Esporte Clube players
Coritiba Foot Ball Club players
Sport Club do Recife players
Esporte Clube Bahia players
Yokohama F. Marinos players
Sportspeople from Alagoas